The End of College: Creating the Future of Learning and the University of Everywhere is a book by higher education writer and policy analyst Kevin Carey about the future of higher education.

References

 
 
 
 
 
 
 
 
 
 
 
 

Interviews

External links
 
 Carey discussing the book on C-SPAN, March 2015

Books about higher education
Riverhead Books books
2015 non-fiction books